The following is a list of films produced in the Tamil film industry in India in 1966, in alphabetical order.

1966

References 

1966
Films, Tamil
Lists of 1966 films by country or language
1960s Tamil-language films